The Man of the West is a 1912 American silent film starring King Baggot and directed by Otis Turner. It was produced by Independent Moving Pictures (IMP).

External links
 

1912 films
American romantic drama films
American silent short films
American black-and-white films
1912 short films
Films directed by Otis Turner
1912 romantic drama films
1910s American films
Silent romantic drama films
Silent American drama films